Ethan James Barnett (born 23 August 1996), best known by his stage name Ten Tonnes, is an English singer-songwriter from Hertford. He released his self-titled debut studio album through Warner Bros. Records on 3 May 2019. His self-titled album scored a top 40 position in the UK upon release. He is the brother of singer-songwriter George Ezra.

Discography

Studio albums

Extended plays

Singles

Awards and nominations

References

External links
 

1996 births
Living people
21st-century English singers
English male guitarists
English male singers
English male singer-songwriters
People from Hertford
21st-century British guitarists
21st-century British male singers
English male rappers